Keratoconjunctivitis is inflammation ("-itis") of the cornea and conjunctiva.

When only the cornea is inflamed, it is called keratitis; when only the conjunctiva is inflamed, it is called conjunctivitis.


Causes
There are several potential causes of the inflammation:
 Keratoconjunctivitis sicca is used when the inflammation is due to dryness. ("Sicca" means "dryness" in medical contexts.) It occurs with 20% of rheumatoid arthritis patients.
 The term "vernal keratoconjunctivitis" (VKC) is used to refer to keratoconjunctivitis occurring in spring, and is usually considered to be due to allergens.
 "Atopic keratoconjunctivitis" is one manifestation of atopy.
 "Epidemic keratoconjunctivitis" is caused by an adenovirus infection.
 "Infectious bovine keratoconjunctivitis" (IBK) is a disease affecting cattle caused by the bacteria Moraxella bovis.
 "Pink eye in sheep and goat" is another infectious keratoconjunctivitis of veterinary concern, mostly caused by Chlamydophila pecorum.
 "Superior limbic keratoconjunctivitis" is thought to be caused by mechanical trauma.
 "Keratoconjunctivitis photoelectrica" (arc eye) means inflammation caused by photoelectric UV light. It is a type of ultraviolet keratitis. Such UV exposure can be caused by arc welding without wearing protective eye glass, or by high altitude exposure from sunlight reflected from snow ("snow blindness"). The inflammation will only appear after about 6 to 12 hours. It can be treated by rest, as the inflammation usually heals after 24–48 hours.  Proper eye protection should be worn to prevent keratoconjunctivitis photoelectrica.

References

External links 

 eMedicine – on Atopic keratoconjunctivitis
 eMedicine – on Epidemic keratoconjunctivitis

Inflammations
Disorders of sclera and cornea
Disorders of conjunctiva